Siege of Port Royal may refer to:
Siege of Port Royal (1707), two failed British sieges conducted against French Port Royal, Acadia (modern Annapolis Royal, Nova Scotia)
Siege of Port Royal (1710), the Conquest of Acadia, a successful British siege conducted against Port Royal, Acadia
Siege of Fort Anne (1744), an unsuccessful French siege against British Annapolis Royal, Nova Scotia

See also
Battle of Port Royal (disambiguation)